Albert II (12 December 1298 – 16 August 1358), known as the Wise or the Lame, a member of the House of Habsburg, was duke of Austria and Styria from 1330, as well as duke of Carinthia and margrave of Carniola from 1335 until his death.

Biography
Albert II was born at Habsburg Castle in Swabia, a younger son of King Albert I of Germany and his wife Elizabeth of Carinthia, a member of the House of Gorizia (Meinhardiner). He initially prepared for an ecclesiastical career and, though still a minor, was elected Bishop of Passau in 1313. However, he had to rival with an opposing candidate and finally renounced the office in 1317.

After the death of their elder brother Frederick the Fair in 1330, the surviving sons Albert II and Otto the Merry became joint rulers of all Habsburg dominions in Austria and Styria. Albert was able to further increase his possessions by the inheritance of his wife Joanna of Pfirt, which was made up of the Alsatian county of Pfirt and several cities. Furthermore, upon the death of his maternal uncle Duke Henry of Carinthia in 1335, Albert succeeded in establishing his claims on the Duchy of Carinthia and the March of Carniola, when he reached his enfeoffment by Emperor Louis IV against the claims raised by his mighty Luxembourg rival King John of Bohemia.

Reflecting his high reputation among the secular and church leaders of Europe, in 1335 Pope Benedict XII asked him to mediate in the church's conflict with Emperor Louis. Two years later, King Philip VI of France 1337 asked him for help against the Wittelsbach emperor and King Edward III of England. Nevertheless, Albert remained faithful to the emperor until Louis' death in 1347; he also was a close ally of his son Duke Louis V of Bavaria. After the demolition of Rapperswil Castle by the forces of Rudolf Brun in 1350, the Austrian duke marched against the Swiss Confederacy and laid siege to the city of Zürich, though to no avail.

In Austria, Duke Albert had the construction of the Gothic Choir begun in St. Stephen's Cathedral in Vienna, known as the Albertinian Choir. He established the "Albertinian House Rule" (Albertinische Hausordnung) to predetermine the rules of succession in the Habsburg lands according to the principle of primogeniture. Although the rule was disregarded after his death, it was re-assumed under Emperor Maximilian. Adopted as part of the Pragmatic Sanction in 1713, the Albertinian House Rule effectively remained one of the basic laws of Austria until 1918. Styria owes him its (former) constitution, the so-called "Mountain Book" (Bergbüchel); the same is true for Carinthia.

It has been speculated that Albert had experienced temporal paralysis (explaining his nickname "Albert the Lame") caused by polyarthritis. If so, however, it did not prevent him from fathering numerous children, of whom six survived childhood.

Albert died at Vienna in 1358 and was buried in a monastery of his own foundation, Gaming Charterhouse in present-day Lower Austria.  In 1782 the Gaming Charterhouse was secularized by Joseph II, Holy Roman Emperor; at that time Albert's remains were transferred to the local parish church. In April 1985 they were returned to the Gaming Charterhouse in a ceremony attended by Regina von Habsburg, wife of the Head of the House of Habsburg, Otto von Habsburg, as well as her son Karl von Habsburg.

According to his House Rule, Albert was succeeded by his eldest son Rudolf IV whose younger brothers acted as regents. However, after Rudolf's death in 1365, the Habsburg lands were divided among Albert's younger sons Albert III and Leopold III by the 1379 Treaty of Neuberg.

Family and children
On 15 February 1324, Albert married Countess Johanna of Pfirt, daughter of Count Ulrich III of Pfirt, in Vienna. The couple had the following children:
 Rudolf IV, Duke of Austria (1 November 1339, Vienna – 27 July 1365, Milan), who succeeded his father as Duke of Austria, Styria and Carinthia. His marriage with Catherine of Luxembourg remained childless; upon his death, he was succeeded by his younger brothers Albert III and Leopold III.
 Catherine (1342, Vienna – 10 January 1381, Vienna), Abbess of St. Klara in Vienna.
 Margaret (1346, Vienna – 14 January 1366, Brno), married:
 in Passau 4 September 1359 Count Meinhard III of Gorizia-Tyrol;
 in Vienna 1364 Margrave John Henry of Moravia.
 Frederick III, Duke of Austria (1347, Vienna – 1362, Vienna). Died unmarried.
 Albert III, Duke of Austria (9 September 1349, Vienna – 29 August 1395, Castle Laxenburg). His first marriage with Elisabeth of Bohemia, a daughter of the Luxembourg emperor Charles IV remained childless; secondly, he married Beatrix of Nuremberg, a daughter of the Hohenzollern burgrave Frederick V. Progenitor of the Habsburg Albertinian line.
 Leopold III, Duke of Austria (1 November 1351, Vienna – 9 July 1386, Sempach). Married to Viridis Visconti, second daughter of Barnabò Visconti, Lord of Milan; progenitor of the Habsburg Leopoldian line.

Ancestry

Notes

References

Citations

Sources 

 Gabrielle Caerr-Stamm: Johanna von Pfirt, Gattin des Habsburgers Albrecht II. Herzog von Österreich oder das europäische Schicksal einer Elsässerin ("wife of Habsburg Albert II Duke of Austria or the European Fate of an Alsatian"). Sundgaugeschichtsverein, Riedisheim 1996, .
 Franz Kurz: Österreich unter Herzog Albrecht dem Lahmen ("Austria under Duke Albert the Lame"), Haslinger, Linz 1819.

External links 
 

Albert 2 of Austria
Albert 2 of Austria
14th-century dukes of Austria
Albert 2
Albert 2
Austrian twins
Royalty and nobility with disabilities
Sons of kings